Spring Valley Rural Historic District is a national historic district located near Fries, Grayson County, Virginia, United States.  The district encompasses 184 contributing buildings, 3 contributing sites, and 1 contributing object in the wooded and agricultural northeastern corner of Grayson County.  It includes mostly frame or log structures, with a few brick buildings, and several well-preserved examples of early-19th century log dwellings still in use.  Notable buildings include the Knob Fork Primitive Baptist Church (c. 1800), William Bourne House "Walnut Hill" (c. 1790), Austin King House (c. 1847), Tomlinson House (c. 1851), O'Donnell Place (c. 1860), Ephraim Boyer House (c. 1870), John Fielder Farmhouse (c. 1850, c. 1870), Ebenezer Methodist Church and Cemetery (c. 1884), Spring Valley Academy (c. 1880), Glenn Cornett House (1904), and Phipps Bourne Farmstead (1909).  Located in the district is the separately listed Stephen G. Bourne House.

It was listed on the National Register of Historic Places in 2011.

References

External link

Historic districts on the National Register of Historic Places in Virginia
Colonial Revival architecture in Virginia
Houses completed in 1910
Houses in Grayson County, Virginia
National Register of Historic Places in Grayson County, Virginia